is a professional Japanese baseball player. He plays infielder for the Orix Buffaloes.

References 

1992 births
Living people
Baseball people from Osaka Prefecture
Meiji University alumni
Nippon Professional Baseball infielders
Orix Buffaloes players
People from Hannan, Osaka